Kaiser Max-class ironclad may refer to:

 , group of three broadside ironclads built in the early 1860s
 , group of three casemate ships built in the 1870s